Yanfolila Cercle is an administrative subdivision of the Sikasso Region of southern Mali. The administrative center (chef-lieu) is the town of Yanfolila.

The cercle is divided into 12 communes:

Baya
Bolo-Fouta
Djallon-Foula
Djiguiya de Koloni
Gouanan
Gouandiaka
Koussan
Sankarani
Séré Moussa Ani Samou De Siékorolé
Tagandougou
Wassoulou-Ballé
Yallankoro-Soloba

The town of Yanfolila lies within the rural commune of Wassoulou-Ballé.

References

Cercles of Mali
Sikasso Region